Stephen Carl Milne is an American mathematician who works in the fields of analysis, analytic number theory, and combinatorics.

Milne received a bachelor's degree from San Diego State University in 1972 and a Ph.D. from the University of California, San Diego (UCSD) in 1976.  His thesis, Peano curves and smoothness of functions, was written under Adriano M. Garsia. From 1976 to 1978 he was a Gibbs Instructor at Yale University. Milne taught at Texas A&M University, UCSD, the University of Kentucky, and Ohio State University, where he became in 1982 an associate professor and in 1985 a full professor.

Milne works on algebraic combinatorics, classical analysis, special functions, analytic number theory, and Lie algebras (generalizations of the Macdonald identities).

From 1981 to 1983 he was a Sloan Fellow. In 2007 he was the joint recipient with Heiko Harborth of the Euler Medal. In 2012 Milne was elected a Fellow of the American Mathematical Society.

Selected publications

with Glenn Lilly:

References

External links
Homepage at Ohio State University

20th-century American mathematicians
21st-century American mathematicians
Living people
University of California, San Diego alumni
Ohio State University faculty
Combinatorialists
Mathematical analysts
Fellows of the American Mathematical Society
Year of birth missing (living people)